Bodwell High School is a private co-educational boarding school offering grades 8 to 12, and university preparation, in North Vancouver, British Columbia, Canada.

Background
Bodwell High School was founded in 1991 in the City of Vancouver and is a non-denominational, co-educational day and boarding school, offering grades 8 to 12 and university preparation. In September, 2003, the school moved into its new facility on Harbourside Drive in North Vancouver, overlooking Burrard Inlet and the Vancouver harbour. Bodwell's purpose is to "provide a culturally diverse environment for students from around the globe, and enable them to become active learners and well-rounded citizens who contribute positively to the world."

Bodwell's courses follow the Provincial Curriculum prescribed by the British Columbia Ministry of Education. Students who fulfill the graduation program receive a high school graduation diploma issued by the Ministry of Education. Junior and senior grades are specialized to best fit the needs of Bodwell students.

As of the Fall 2016 Term, Bodwell students represented over 40 countries.

School culture & philosophy
The Bodwell motto or school slogan is "Strength in Diversity" and "Education for a Changing World"

Bodwell may be named after one of the first settlers in Vancouver whom had ties with the CPR Railway.

Awards
Bodwell High School won the Study Travel Magazine prize for 'STM Star High School Award' in 2014 and again in 2015. In June 2015, Bodwell won the Excellence in International Education Marketing Award from the BCCIE.

Certifications
Bodwell High School is certified by the British Columbia Ministry of Education.

Memberships
Bodwell High School is a member of the British Columbia Council for International Education (BCCIE), the Federation of Independent Schools British Columbia (FISA), Study in British Columbia, Imagine Canada, the Canada Eurasia Russia Business Federation (CERBA), and the Brazilian Educational & Language Travel Association (BELTA).

School teams & activities
Athletic teams and clubs
 Boys Basketball
 Boys Soccer
 Boys Volleyball
 Boys Swimming
 Boys Track and Field
 Girls Basketball
 Girls Volleyball
 Girls Swimming
 Girls Track and Field
 Co-ed Badminton
 Co-ed Softball

Competitive teams
 Outdoor Adventure
 Cross Country Running
 Ski and Snowboard
 Fitness
 Floor Hockey
 Table Tennis
 Tennis
 Track & Field
 Yoga & Stretching
 Wrestling

Art clubs
 Creative Arts
 Open Art Studio
 Fashion Design
 Photography
 Knitting
 Video Production

Performing art clubs
 Acting
 Drama
 Hip Hop
 Guitar
 Advanced Band
 Jazz
 Music Technology
 Rock Band
 Vocal/Choral

References

External links

Boarding schools in British Columbia
High schools in British Columbia
Preparatory schools in British Columbia
Private schools in British Columbia
North Vancouver (city)
Educational institutions established in 1991
1991 establishments in British Columbia